The 2002 MBNA All-American Heroes 400 was an NASCAR Winston Cup Series race held on September 22, 2002 at Dover International Speedway, in Dover, Delaware. Contested over 400 laps on the  concrete speedway, it was the 28th race of the 2002 NASCAR Winston Cup Series season. Jimmie Johnson of Hendrick Motorsports won the race.

Background
Dover International Speedway (formerly Dover Downs International Speedway) is a race track in Dover, Delaware, United States. Since opening in 1969, it has held at least two NASCAR races per year. In addition to NASCAR, the track also hosted USAC and the IndyCar Series. The track features one layout, a  concrete oval, with 24° banking in the turns and 9° banking on the straights. The speedway is owned and operated by Dover Motorsports.

The track, nicknamed "The Monster Mile", was built in 1969 by Melvin Joseph of Melvin L. Joseph Construction Company, Inc., with an asphalt surface, but was replaced with concrete in 1995. Six years later in 2001, the track's capacity moved to 135,000 seats, making the track have the largest capacity of sports venue in the mid-Atlantic. In 2002, the name changed to Dover International Speedway from Dover Downs International Speedway after Dover Downs Gaming and Entertainment split, making Dover Motorsports. From 2007 to 2009, the speedway worked on an improvement project called "The Monster Makeover", which expanded facilities at the track and beautified the track. After the 2014 season, the track's capacity was reduced to 95,500 seats.

Top 10 results

Race statistics
 Time of race: 3:18:40
 Average Speed: 
 Pole Speed: 
 Cautions: 6 for 37 laps
 Margin of Victory: 0.535 sec
 Lead changes: 15
 Percent of race run under caution: 9.2%         
 Average green flag run: 51.9 laps

References

2002 MBNA All-American Heroes 400
2002 MBNA All-American Heroes 400
NASCAR races at Dover Motor Speedway